The 1992–93 Holy Cross Crusaders men's basketball team represented the College of the Holy Cross during the 1992–93 NCAA Division I men's basketball season. The Crusaders, led by head coach George Blaney, played their home games at the Hart Center and were members of the Patriot League. They finished the season 23–7, 12–2 in Patriot League play to finish in second place. They defeated Army, Fordham, and Bucknell to win the Patriot League tournament and earn the conference's automatic bid to the NCAA tournament. As No. 13 seed in the East region, they lost to Arkansas in the opening round, 94–64.

Roster

Schedule and results
,

|-
!colspan=9 style=|Non-conference regular season

|-
!colspan=9 style=|Patriot League regular season

|-
!colspan=9 style=| Patriot League tournament

|-
!colspan=9 style=|NCAA tournament

References

Holy Cross Crusaders men's basketball seasons
Holy Cross
Holy Cross Crusaders men's basketball
Holy Cross Crusaders men's basketball
Holy Cross